Angelfish may refer to:
Several groups of fish: 
Freshwater angelfish, tropical cichlids of the genus Pterophyllum
Marine angelfish of the family Pomacanthidae
Atlantic pomfret (Brama brama), sold by fishmongers as "angelfish" in South Africa (where it is a bycatch of the hake fishery)
Angelshark of the family Squatinidae
Atlantic spadefish (Chaetodipterus faber)
Cave angelfish, a karst-dwelling member of the family Balitoridae, found only in Thailand
Angelfish (band), a short-lived Scottish alternative rock band, former band of Garbage's Shirley Manson
Angelfish (album), a 1994 album by the band Angelfish
Angelfish charity, a UK charity that helps disabled and deprived children in Cambodia
Mark Twain's angelfish, a group of young women who served as surrogate granddaughters to author Mark Twain (Samuel Clemens) during the last years of his life